Professor David Danon (October 17, 1921 – October 17, 2015) was a physician, a scientist, a leader in the study of the biology of aging, and a painter. He was the inventor of a unique treatment for the healing of pressure ulcers and other severe wounds that do not respond to conventional treatments.  Before the creation of the state of Israel, he was a commander in Irgun, the Zionist paramilitary group also known as "Etzel".  He was the founder and the first commander of the Israeli Air Force's first airborne military medical evacuation unit, the founder and first president of the Israeli Association for Electron Microscopy, director of the Gerontology Center at the Weizmann Institute of Science, and Chief Scientist of the Israeli Ministry of Health.

Childhood and youth 
David Danon was born in 1921 to Regina and Moshe Danon in Pazardzhik (Bulgarian: Пазарджик, also spelled as Pazardjik or Pazarjik), Bulgaria. David's parents were doctors: his mother was a gynecologist and his father was a family physician. His parents were Zionists and in 1924 they immigrated with three children (Nora, David and Ida) and settled in the Jaffa section of Tel Aviv.

Irgun activity 
Immediately after graduation from high school, David Danon joined the Irgun (Etzel) and his nom de guerre was "Ehud".  He joined the Irgun together with his two classmates and close boyhood friends Amichai Paglin (who was later to become the Chief Operations Officer of the Irgun, Prime Minister Menachem Begin's counter-terrorism advisor, and Prime Minister Begin's Ambassador to the United States) and Eliyahu Bet-Zuri (who later joined the more militant Lehi, and was executed in Egypt for the assassination of Lord Moyne). Over time, as a member of the Irgun, David Danon was appointed a commander in the punch units. With the declaration of rebellion against the British Mandate by Menachem Begin, Danon participated in several of the first attacks against British government targets, and was sent to Beirut to try to obtain weapons. During what was then dubbed The Hunting Season (the Saison), as was proclaimed by the Haganah, he was arrested based on information obtained by an informant, taken to jail in Jaffa, and later sent to detention in Latrun. Seven month later, David's father succeeded in negotiating his release from the British by promising to register David as a medical student at the University of Geneva Medical School (where David's father had professional connections) and by committing to the British that David would not return to Palestine for the duration of the British Mandate. Per agreement with the British, David traveled to Geneva by ship within one or two days of his release from Latrun and began his medical studies. By the end of 1947, however, he postponed his medical studies and returned to Irgun activity, seeking out and collecting weapons in France to be sent to Irgun fighters in Palestine.  He did so primarily by obtaining weapons left over from World War II from sympathetic former members of the French Resistance.  Having collected the needed arms, he prepared to send them from France to the Irgun on the ill-fated ship, the "Altalena", which departed for the newly created state of Israel, then in the midst of its War of Independence. While David remained in exile in Geneva to continue his studies, several of his Irgun friends and compatriots were either injured or killed when Israeli forces clashed with Irgun fighters from the Altalena and ultimately shelled the ship.  Later, David was sent to ][Tunis\\ to organize self-defense among the Tunisian Jewish community.

Medical school 

David Danon arrived at Medical School of University of Geneva on December 31, 1946 late in the first semester pursuant to the agreement between his father and the British Mandate authorities, essentially exiling him from Palestine for the duration of the British Mandate.  He arrived without any knowledge of the French language. Despite his late start in his first year of medical school and his having to learn the French language, he excelled.  During his second year in medical school he began to do research.  His research was published in the scientific literature between the years 1948 and 1950. 
One of his Important projects was the study of the structure of the human nervous system. The use of conventional microscopes for this work was an obstacle due to the limited resolution capability of the common optical microscope. In order to facilitate the use of the more sophisticated electron microscope it was necessary to cut thinner slices of tissue.  Thus, David Danon developed the Microtome (a device for cutting extremely thin slices of tissue) for use on the electron microscope.  The University of Geneva recognized David for his development of this innovative device by awarding him the "best dissertation" award.

Airborne military evacuation unit 

Following the 1948 declaration of the State of Israel and following the completion of his medical studies, in 1953 David returned to Israel and began his mandatory military service in the Israeli Air Force. In 1954, Dan Tolkowsky (the commander of the Israeli Air Force at that time) ordered David to establish the airborne medical evacuation unit and appointed him first commander of the unit.  In later years, David participated in the airborne evacuation of Israeli military casualties during the Suez Crisis (1956), the Six-Day War (1967), the War of Attrition (1967–1970) and the Yom Kippur War (1973).  During the War of Attrition, he developed a unique device for checking the cardiac activity of the wounded on the field of battle, permitting medical personnel in the field to determine whether an injured soldier was still alive.  Immediately after the Yom Kippur War, David canceled a planned sabbatical year in the United States and enlisted instead in the Israeli Air Force for one year of service, to assist in improving the capacity of the airborne medical evacuation unit.  In 1978, he was recognized by the Israeli Air Force for his commitment to the Air Force medical unit and for all the above-mentioned activities.

Scientific activity 

While David was still serving in the Air Force, Prof. Aharon Katzir from the Weizmann Institute of Science in Rehovot, asked David to rebuild the Institute's electron microscope which had been damaged while researchers tried to activate it. For a few months, David was working as a military doctor during the day and at the Weizmann Institute of Science at night.  In 1955, upon his completion of military service, he began working in the Department of Polymers of the Weizmann Institute. In addition to restoring the function of the electron microscope, he developed and prepared the microtome and other devices necessary for the operation of the electron microscope. Later he founded the Electron Microscopy Laboratory at the Weizmann Institute. His pearly research in the Institute's Electron Microscopy Laboratory involved the membrane structure of erythrocytes, their adherence and thrombocytes. In 1957, while working at the Weizmann Institute David Danon founded with Dr. Kalman the Department of Physiology and Anatomy of Animals, at the Faculty of Agriculture in Rehovot where he taught until 1962. His research during this period continued to focus on erythrocytes and thrombocytes, as well as the interaction between these cells and the influenza virus.  In 1964 he was appointed head of the Section for Biological Ultrastructure at the Weizmann Institute.  In 1967 he was assigned the title of "professor of biology."  Prof. Danon was the founder and first President of the Israeli Society for Electron Microscopy and President of the Israeli Society of Hematology and Blood Transfusion. At this time he developed and built Fragiligraph,  – a device that enables automatic registration of osmotic fragility curve of erythrocytes, later produced by "Elron".
. In later years, Prof. Danon became interested in the process of aging of erythrocytes, and joined the Israeli Association of Gerontology.  In 1975 he was elected president of the International Association of Gerontology, and was the first and only Israeli scientist to date to serve in this position (1975-1978). Between the years 1978 to 1987, Prof. Danon served as the Chief Scientist of the Israeli Ministry of Health. In 1979, he was appointed director of the Center for Research on Aging at the Weizmann Institute, a position he held until his retirement from the Institute in 1987. During a Sabbatical in geriatric medicine at Montefiore Hospital in New York in 1984-1985, he devoted major efforts to alleviating the suffering of patients with pressure ulcers. Between the years 1998 to 1991 he served as scientific advisor to the Israeli Ministry of Labor and Social Affairs. Upon his retirement from Weizmann Institute, Prof. Danon was the director of the Waldenberg Gerontology Research Center in New Orleans, Louisiana from 1987 to 1992. At that time while continuing his research on the healing of pressure ulcers, he discovered the critical role of macrophages (a special type of white blood cell) in wound healing.  He discovered that the injection of macrophages from young mice, accelerated the healing of wounds in old mice. From 1993 onwards Prof. Danon devoted himself entirely to the development of a unique, remarkably simple, yet new method for the treatment of severe wounds, based on the injection of "activated" macrophages.  In this method, Macrophages were prepared from blood units of standard donated blood, using white blood cells that are typically considered undesirable in routine blood transfusions.  Macrophages were prepared from a blood unit in a closed sterile system that consisted of a number of interconnected plastic bags. According to the method developed by Prof. Danon, macrophages activation is done by the "hypo-osmotic shock" without any of the toxic materials usually used to activate cells. This work was carried out in the laboratories of Magen David Adom (the Israeli blood bank), and after many years of work the project was crowned with success.  As of 1998, the Israeli Ministry of Health has approved the use of activated macrophage injections for the treatment of serious pressure ulcers and other difficult wounds that are not responsive to standard treatments.  The method has been so effective, that it is included as covered within Israel's government health coverage plan.

Awards and acknowledgments 

In 1977, then Israeli Prime Minister Menachem Begin suggested nominating Prof. Danon president of Israel. However, after consultation on this issue with his colleagues at the Weizmann Institute, especially president Ephraim Katzir, Prof Danon came to the conclusion that it was preferable for him to continue to engage in scientific research. In 1989 he was awarded the prize of the International Association of Aging (Sandoz Prize.) In 1998, he was awarded Ze'ev Jabotinsky Award for "lifetime achievement in the service of the national idea and the State of Israel and his contribution to science."

Painting 

David Danon studied painting with Aharon Avni, the founder of the Avni Art Institute. Throughout his life, beginning with his teen years, David Danon was painting: when he was imprisoned at Latrun, while attending the University of Geneva Medical School, during the wars in which he served in the airborne medical evacuation unit, while on sabbatical, while traveling, during Army service, and in every place where he worked as a scientist. Some of his paintings were exhibited in research and medical institutions in which he worked. In 2011 David Danon had a solo exhibition at the "Foyer gallery" in Petah Tikva, by the name "Seventy Years of Painting".

Family 
David Danon left a wife, three children and seven grandchildren .

References

1921 births
2015 deaths
Israeli military doctors
Israeli biologists
Gerontologists
Biogerontologists
Academic staff of Weizmann Institute of Science
Irgun members
University of Geneva alumni
Bulgarian emigrants to Mandatory Palestine
Israeli people of Bulgarian-Jewish descent
Burials at Yarkon Cemetery